Rhodeus meridionalis is a species of freshwater ray-finned fish in the genus Rhodeus.  It is found in Bulgaria, Greece, North Macedonia, and Serbia, where it is found from the Vardar River to Pinios River.

References

Rhodeus
Fish described in 1924
Taxa named by Stanko Karaman